Mule is a style of shoe that has no back or constraint around the foot's heel. Mules have a history going as far back as Ancient Rome, even though they were not popularly worn until sixteenth-century Europe. There, mules were bedroom slippers and not worn in public. Through the centuries, mules have changed in style and purpose and are no longer just boudoir shoes but are worn at any time, for any occasion. In addition to Western examples, mules come from cultures such as Turkey and Egypt, and appear in popular culture, from famous paintings to iconic celebrities' shoes.

History

Etymology and original purpose 
Mule's etymology comes from Ancient Rome. In Ancient Rome, the phrase "mulleus calceus" [mullet shoe] was used to describe the red or purple shoe worn by the three Roman senators and later higher magistrates. In 16th century Europe and France, the Latin root word "mule" was used to refer to both backless shoes and slippers.

Mules of the 16th century to the 19th century were bedroom or boudoir slippers worn inside and not out in public. Accordingly, mules were worn with dressing gowns and typically matched the loose outfits by having the same comfort. The early mules did not have any distinguishable features. This style of shoe has a storied history: when Comtesse d’Olonne, the risqué society beauty, wore a soft red pair of mules to church in 1694 – daringly peeping from beneath her richly-embellished skirt – it paved the way for the style.

History of their popularity 
While mules have been worn since the 15th century to the present day, their popularity has not always been constant. They were typical indoor shoes for both men and women in the early 1700s. By the 1720s to the end of the century, mules were the most popular indoor slipper. Fashion plates that exist from the end of the 1790s describe women wearing mules but are not seen due to the long lengths of the contemporary petticoats. Therefore, they were popular by the end of the 1700 but not as visible. In the beginning of the 1800s mules went out of style. In the mid to early 1800s, they rose in popularity again.

In the 1860s, prostitutes wore mules in the brothels. The public avoided wearing them.

In the late 20th century, mules were again in fashion as they embraced the trends. They were especially popular during the end of the 1990s in the high-fashion as elite designers put their own touch on the mule.

The 21st century has both accepted and rejected the mule trend. Most recently, Elle magazine called mules the shoe of 2017.

Styles 

Mules have changed in style over time. In the fifteenth century mules from Venice were stilted and resembled chopines. Their toes were of all shapes: round, square and forked. The heel similarly was not constrained in height. Heels ranged from 1 5/8 inches to 2 ½ inches. Mules were embroidered across centuries from 1550 to 1700. For example, Florentine embroidery, which is a flame stitch of various lengths, was popular during the 18th century. Throughout the 1700s, mules were regularly heeled and worn by both men and women. Between 1720 and 1790 the shoe structure itself was relatively dull and boring not to distract from eye-catchy buckles.  By 1850s, heeled mules were less frequent for men. From 1885 to 1910, the trend of large buckles and elaborate trims was replaced by less decorated low heeled leather and felt shoes.

In the twentieth century wartime mules of the 1940s were made of lino, oilcloth, felt, compounds of raffia, rattan, bark or synthetic hemp. 1950s mules were made from plastic and decorated with feathers. The marabou mule promoted the time periods "sex-kitten" ideals. The styles for mules in the 1960s and in the 1980s mirrored the shoe trends of their respective decades. For the 1960s, mules had angular shapes and pointy toes. In the 1980s, this meant that mules were colorful, opulent, and highly accessorized with jewels.

Mules for men 
Mules not only came in different styles and various decorations, but also can be categorized by distinct types. In the nineteenth century, two male slippers were very popular mules. In the late 1880s, a very popular version of the mule at the time in England was the Albert. In addition to the Albert, the Alfred was also a man's boudoir, or morning slipper. This name comes from Daniel Green and Company 1892's "Alfred Dolge's Felt Slippers and Shoes."

Mules in the East

Mules also appear in eastern cultures. This history is similarly rich originating from the 800s and still present today. In eighth century Egypt, mules are depicted on gravestones and seem to be made of red kid. Iranian mules from 1800 to 1889 were made of velvet, leather, silk, metal thread. They are shaped like a fish. A mule from Turkey in the Metropolitan Museum's collection is made of wood, leather, metal, and silk. Mules from India were made from cow, buffalo or goat hide, fur, silk, wool, or cotton fiber, velvets, brocade and reeds and grass. Similar to the European examples, mules in India were embroidered and embellished with tassels and appliqué. In South Asia, a jutti is a type of shoe that is similar to the mule because it does not have backs. Sometimes, mules resemble Turkish babouche because of the use of Near Eastern fabrics. For example, Pierre Yantorny's mules designed for Rita de Acosta Lydig are made of an identical to other Near Eastern footwear. She potentially wore these shoes with a harem dress, further illustrating Eastern culture.

In popular culture
 

Mules have been associated with several celebrities. Queen Henrietta Maria, wife of Charles I famously wore an embroidered pair of mules in the 17th century. In Édouard Manet's 1863 painting Olympia, the central woman wears mules in bed. Her shoes connect to a type of slipper (chausson), which was slang for "old prostitute". During the 1950s, iconic actresses like Marilyn Monroe, Joan Fontaine, and Jayne Russel wore the marabou mules in their films and daily lives. For example, Marilyn Monroe wore them in The Seven Year Itch. Carrie Bradshaw from Sex and the City frequently wore mules. In Marie Claire's list of the top 32 Carrie Bradshaw shoes, six pairs are mules. 

In 2017, many celebrities and models were sighted wearing versions of the mules. Gigi Hadid designed a mule for Stuart Weitzman's spring 2017 collection. Beyoncé's instagram post of her wearing Givenchy mules received over 2 million likes. Gucci's Princetown loafer is a version of a mule worn by both men and women. In 2015, a version of this shoe was lined with kangaroo fur, which stirred anti fur activists. These shoes were snapped on celebrities' social media platforms from Marc Jacobs to Leandra Medine of Man Repeller.

Gallery

References

External links

Shoes